Aït Ishaq is a town in Khénifra Province, Béni Mellal-Khénifra, Morocco. Ait Ishak is a Moroccan Berber village in central Morocco.
Ait Ishaq belongs to the province of Khenifra and is 25 km south of its capital.
It includes the Ait Ishak Center in its 19 suburbs.
36,652 people (according to the 2021 census).
This city was the oldest region in Morocco in the middle of the eleventh century AH, the capital of the Emirate of Daliyah. It was founded by Muhammad al-Hajj al-Dulai and began building it on Sunday 16 Rabi’ al-Awwal 1048 AH - July 28, 1638 AD. At that time, it was not called by this name, but was called Zawiya Al-Daliyah, and it continued to bear this name until it was seized and destroyed by Sultan Al-Mawla Al-Rashid in 1079 AH - 1668 AD, where it remained after that as a ruin and ruins here and there. So, the Good Lord transferred the Jews of this city to the city of Fez to activate the economic activity there and built for them the Ibn Danan Synagogue..

Notable people 

 Hadda Ouakki

References

Populated places in Khénifra Province